Nam-seon, also spelled Nam-sun, is a Korean unisex given name. Its meaning depends on the hanja used to write each syllable of the name. There are five hanja with the reading "nam" and 41 hanja with the reading "seon" on the South Korean government's official list of hanja which may be used in given names.

People with this name include:
Choe Nam-seon (1890–1957), Korean male historian and independence activist
Ryu Soo-young (born 1979 as Eo Nam-seon), South Korean male actor
Kim Nam-sun (born 1981), South Korean female handball player who competed at the 2008 Summer Olympics

See also
List of Korean given names

References

Korean unisex given names